Terson may refer to:

Peter Terson (1932–2021), English playwright
Terson syndrome, eye condition